Jeffery L. Briggs (born March 10, 1957) is the American founder and former President and CEO of Firaxis Games, a video game developer based in Hunt Valley, Maryland, United States. He was previously a game designer at MicroProse but left that company in 1996 along with Sid Meier and Brian Reynolds to form Firaxis Games.

Career
Briggs holds a Doctorate in Musical Composition and Theory from the University of Illinois. Briggs' composition teachers included Samuel Adler, Warren Benson, Joseph Schwantner, Donald Freund, and John Melby. His career began in New York City where he composed music for various events, including dance and theater groups. He took a job as game editor and designer at West End Games where he worked until 1987. He then joined MicroProse Software, where he served as designer, writer, composer and producer, becoming the company's Executive Producer and, finally, its Director of Product Development.

Briggs's music first appeared in a 1989 MicroProse release Sword of the Samurai. Following that, most MicroProse games featured his work. Before working in software entertainment, Briggs' music had already received performances by ensembles internationally in Paris' Pompidou Centre ("Ecliptic"), New York City's Avery Fisher Hall ("Comets"), and in the Krannert Center for the Performing Arts in Illinois ("Adjectives," "Firaxis", "Chimera," "Aurora," and others) as well as various smaller venues in New York and other cities throughout the United States. In 1996, he was awarded US Patent 5,496,962 for a "System for Real-Time Music Composition and Synthesis" used in a product called "CPU Bach".

Briggs left MicroProse in 1996 to co-found Firaxis Games. In a 2004 interview he commented his decision: "Civ II had just come out and MicroProse had been purchased by Spectrum HoloByte. [...] Things had gotten pretty bad. By that time I was director of product development and they were asking me to do things and tell people things that I just didn't like. I decided that I could do a lot better job running the company than they could, so I left." Briggs then led the design of Civilization III and oversaw the expansion of the company into a major developer of strategy computer games. He also co-designed Colonization and Civilization II, as well as composing much of the original music in Civilization IV. He negotiated the acquisition of Firaxis Games by Take Two Interactive in 2005, became its Chairman in spring of 2006, and left Firaxis in November of that year.

In 2009, the Westfield Symphony Orchestra presented the world premiere of his composition "Celebration for Orchestra".

Games

Awards
In 2003, Briggs was named software "Entrepreneur of the Year" by Ernst & Young, and in 2004 he was named "CEO of the Year" by Baltimore SmartCEO magazine.

He was awarded the Bernard and Rose Sernoffsky and Louis Lane Prizes for Music Composition at the Eastman School of Music (1978, 1979), the Haimsohm Prize for Musical Composition at the University of Memphis (1980),the ASCAP Award for Young Composers (1984), and a MacDowell Colony Fellowship (1986).

References

External links
 Jeff Briggs' home page
 
 Jeff Briggs Named 'CEO of the Year' by Smart CEO Magazine, Firaxis press release

1957 births
20th-century American composers
20th-century American male musicians
21st-century American composers
21st-century American male musicians
American chief executives
American male composers
American video game designers
Living people
MicroProse people
People from Florence, Alabama
Role-playing game designers
Video game composers